Phillipkeith Alexander Manley (born May 7, 1990) is an American football offensive guard who is currently a free agent. He signed with the Atlanta Falcons as an undrafted free agent in 2012. He played college football at Toledo.

Early years
He was ranked at No. 63 in the state of Ohio by Ohio High Magazine. He was selected for the first-team all-league and first-team All-Butler County.

College career
He played college football at Toledo. He started 13 games in his Junior season at left guard for the Toledo Rockets. In his senior season, he helped anchor an offensive line and offense to rush for 2,777 rushing yards, including Toledo running back Adonis Thomas who also rushed for a team-high 1,071 rushing yards.

Professional career

Atlanta Falcons
On April 30, 2012, he signed with the Atlanta Falcons as an undrafted free agent. On August 31, 2012, he was released. On September 11, 2012, he was signed to the practice squad. On November 6, 2012, he was promoted to the active roster after the team placed offensive guard Garrett Reynolds on injured reserve.

Two days after the team signed him to the practice squad, the Falcons reached an injury settlement with Manley on September 3, 2013.

Dallas Cowboys
On November 6, 2013, he was signed to the Dallas Cowboys practice squad. On November 12, 2013, he was released from the practice squad.

Cleveland Gladiators
Manley was assigned to the Cleveland Gladiators of the Arena Football League. He was reassigned on June 9, 2014.

Carolina Panthers
Manley signed a one-year contract with the Carolina Panthers.

Washington Valor
On July 7, 2017, Manley was claimed off reassignment by the Washington Valor. On July 10, 2017, he was placed on refused to report.

Philadelphia Soul
Manley was assigned to the Philadelphia Soul on March 20, 2018.

References

External links

Atlanta Falcons bio 

1990 births
Living people
Players of American football from Ohio
American football offensive guards
Sportspeople from Hamilton, Ohio
Toledo Rockets football players
Cleveland Gladiators players
Atlanta Falcons players
Dallas Cowboys players
Carolina Panthers players
Washington Valor players
Philadelphia Soul players